Funaro is a surname. Notable people with the surname include:

Dilson Funaro (1933–1989), Brazilian businessman and politician
Frank Funaro (born 1958), American drummer
Robert Funaro (born 1959), American actor

See also
Funari

Surnames of Italian origin